Dario Melnjak (born 31 October 1992) is a Croatian professional footballer who plays as a left back for Prva HNL club Hajduk Split.

Club career
Melnjak started his career in the lower tier Nedeljanec, spending most of his youth career there, apart from two seasons at Varteks at under-15 level. After debuting for his club in the 2010–11 season, he moved on to the Treća HNL West team Zelina, where he achieved promotion to Druga HNL in the 2011–12 season. He remained a first team player in the following season, and moved on to the Prva HNL team Slaven Belupo at the beginning of the 2013–14 season.

On 2 February 2015, Melnjak signed a contract with Belgian side Sporting Lokeren for three-and-a-half seasons.

On 20 June 2016, Melnjak signed for Azerbaijan Premier League side Neftçi on loan. On 10 November 2016, Neftçi and Lokeren mutually agreed to the early termination of Melnjak's loan.

On 23 September 2021, Melnjak signed a one-year contract with Croatian club HNK Hajduk Split, with an option for a further two years. On 19 January 2022, Melnjak extended his contract for two years, with the new deal ending in mid-2024. On 2 March 2022, Melnjak scored two goals against HNK Gorica in the 2021–22 Croatian Football Cup semi-final, taking Hajduk to the final in a 2-1 win. On 26 May 2022, in the 2022 Croatian Football Cup Final, Melnjak again scored twice, this time in a 3-1 win against HNK Rijeka, to give Hajduk its seventh cup win and first since 2012–13.

International career
He made his Croatia national team debut on 11 June 2019 in a friendly against Tunisia, as a starter.

Honours
Hajduk Split
 Croatian Cup: 2021–22

References

External links
 

1992 births
Living people
Sportspeople from Varaždin
Association football fullbacks
Croatian footballers
Croatia international footballers
NK Zelina players
NK Slaven Belupo players
K.S.C. Lokeren Oost-Vlaanderen players
Neftçi PFK players
NK Domžale players
Çaykur Rizespor footballers
HNK Hajduk Split players
First Football League (Croatia) players
Croatian Football League players
Belgian Pro League players
Azerbaijan Premier League players
Slovenian PrvaLiga players
Süper Lig players
Croatian expatriate footballers
Expatriate footballers in Belgium
Expatriate footballers in Azerbaijan
Expatriate footballers in Slovenia
Expatriate footballers in Turkey
Croatian expatriate sportspeople in Belgium
Croatian expatriate sportspeople in Azerbaijan
Croatian expatriate sportspeople in Slovenia
Croatian expatriate sportspeople in Turkey